was a Japanese seinen mixed-media magazine published by Kodansha, aimed at adult males, but particularly at hardcore anime and manga fans, featuring articles as well as manga tied into popular franchises.  Original manga were also featured in the magazine.

It was announced in September 2008 that Magazine Z would be discontinued. The last issue shipped on January 26, 2009.

Manga artists and series serialized in Magazine Z
Hideaki Nishikawa
 Apocrypha Getter Robot Dash (2008 to 2009)

Yuu Watase
 Sakura Taisen (2005 to 2009) (manga commissioned by Sega Enterprises)

Kia Asamiya
 Batman: Child of Dreams (2000 to 2001) (manga commissioned by DC Comics)

Hoshi Itsuki
 Kurau Phantom Memory (2005)
 Skies of Arcadia (2000 to 2002)

Baku Yumemakura/Sei Itoh
 Kouya ni Kemono Doukokusu (2004 to ???)

Momotarō Miyano/Masamune Shirow
 RD Sennou Chousashitsu (2008 to 2009)

Takuya Fujima
 Deus Vitae (1999 to 2002)
 Free Collars Kingdom (2002 to 2003)

Q Hayashida
 Maken X Another (1999 to 2001)

Nishikawa Shinji
 Chouseishin Gransazer (2003 to 2004)

Toshitsugu Iida
 Wolf's Rain (2003 to 2004) (created by Keiko Nobumoto)

Shinya Kaneko
 Culdcept (1999 to 2007)

Yōsuke Kuroda/Ichiro Inui
 Bujingai: Zanou Densetsu (2004 to 2005)

Takahiro Seguchi
 Ai wa Kagerou (2004 to 2006)

Itoh Shi
 Puppet Revolution (2002)

Katsu Aki
 Psychic Academy (1999-2003)

Asuka Katsura
 Le Portrait de Petit Cossette (2004)

Yuuichi Kumakura
 King of Bandit Jing (1999 to 2005)

Asato Mifune
 Yukei Seikyo Kukla (story by Koji Tazawa)

Satoru Akahori/Ryuusei Deguchi
Magical Shopping Arcade Abenobashi (2001 to 2002)

Yuuna Takanagi/Tooru Zekuu
Shikigami no Shiro (2003 to 2004)
 Shikigami no Shiro: Nejireta Shiro-hen (2004 to 2008)

Nozomu Tamaki
 Hakodate Youjin Buraichou Himegami (2007 to 2009)

Haruhiko Mikimoto
 Baby Birth (2001 to 2002) (story by Sukehiro Tomita)

Kenichi Muraeda
 Kamen Rider Spirits (2001 to 2009) (story and concept by Shotaro Ishinomori)

Yuushi Kanoe
 Ayakashi (2007 to 2008)

Sasaki Yoshioka
 Placebo

Ran Satomi/Maki Ebishi
 Doll Star: Kotodama Tsukai Ihon (2008 to 2009)

Sung-gyu Lee/Kyoichi Nanatsuki
 Void (2010)

Auto Taguchi
 Mobile Suit Gundam 00
 Mobile Suit Gundam 00 Second Season

Chiaki Ogishima
 Heat Guy J (2003) (created by Kazuki Akane)

Aikawa Shou/Jinguuji Hajime
 Karakuri Kiden: Hiwou Senki (1999 to 2001)

Atsushi Soga
 Turn A Gundam (1999 to 2002) (story by Yoshiyuki Tomino)

Junji Ito
 Junji Ito's Cat Diary: Yon & Mu (2008 to 2009)

Mimi Natto/Tokumo Sora
 Ism/i (2007 to 2009)

Hajime Ueda
 FLCL (2000 to 2001)
 Q·Ko-chan: The Earth Invader Girl (2003-2004)

Yatate Hajime/Yoshiyuki Tomino/Masatsugu Iwase
 Mobile Suit Gundam SEED (2002 to 2004)
 Mobile Suit Gundam SEED Destiny (2004 to 2006)

Warabino Kugeko
 Heroic Age (2007 to 2008)

Yoshihiko Tomizawa/Hiroyuki Kaidō
 Kikinosuke Gomen (2006 to 2007)

Go Nagai
 Amon: The Darkside of the Devilman (1999 to 2004) (art by Yu Kinutani)
 Demon Lord Dante (2003 to 2004)
 Devilman Mokushiroku: Strange Days (2005)
 Kikoushi Enma (2006)
 Mazinger Angels (2004 to 2006)
 Mazinger Angel Z (2007 to 2008)
 Satanikus Enma Kerberos (2007 to 2009)

Satoshi Urushihara
 Vampire Master Dark Crimson (2000)

You Higuri/George Iida
 Night Head Genesis (2006 to 2008)

Takashige Hiroshi/Soga Atsushi
 Midori no Ou (2003 to 2009)

Tohiro Konno
 Pugyuru (2001 to 2009)

Narumi Kakinouchi
 Yakushiji Ryōko no Kaiki Jikenbo (2004 to 2009) (story by Yoshiki Tanaka)

Tomo Umino
 Aoi Sora no Neosphere (2005 to 2006)

Yuu Kinutaki/Mimi Natto
 The Tales from the Far East (2006 to 2007)

Momotarou Miyano
 RD Senno Chosashitsu (2008 to 2009)

Eishi Ozeki
 Sky Girls (2007)

Kyoichi Nanatsuki/Takayuki Takashi
 8 Man Infinity (2005 - 2007)

Masato Hisa
 Jabberwocky (2006 to 2009)

Kakinouchi Narumi/Hirano Toshiki
 Fuun Sanshimai Lin³ (1999 to 2001)
 Shaolin Sisters: Reborn (2001 to 2003)

Katsuhiro Otomo/Yuu Kinutani
 Steamboy (2005 to 2006)

Ogishima Chiaki
 The Legend of Mikazuchi (1999 to 2002)

Takeaki Momose
 Magikano (2003 to 2008)

Hitoshi Ariga
 The Big O (1999 to 2001)
 Mimimi ~The Tale of a Cat and a Robot~ (2002)

Kaihou Norimitsu/Ishiwatari Daisuke
 Guilty Gear Xtra (2002 to 2003)

Masato Hisa
 Grateful Dead (2003 to 2004)

Yūjiro Izumi
 Popotan (2003 to 2004)

Takumi Kobayashi/Masahiro Sonoda
 Afureko (2007 to 2008)

Tow Ubukata/Kiriko Yumeji
 Le Chevalier D'Eon (2005 to 2008)

Hikaru Nikaidou
 Atomic Nekokabutsu (2005 to 2007)

Kenji Ishikawa/Kouji Tazawa
 Metroid (2002 to 2004) (manga commissioned by Nintendo)

Yoshitomo Akihito
 Companion (2006 to 2008)

Unknown authors;
 Kitty Kitty Fancia (1999 to 2001)
 Wild Arms Flower Thieves'' (1999 to 2001)

References

External links
 Official Magazine Z Website (in Japanese)
 

1999 establishments in Japan
2009 establishments in Japan
Defunct magazines published in Japan
Kodansha magazines
Magazines established in 1999
Magazines disestablished in 2009
Magazines published in Tokyo
Monthly manga magazines published in Japan
Seinen manga magazines